Caroga Creek is a river in Fulton and Montgomery counties in the U.S. State of New York. It begins at East Caroga Lake and flows south passing through Rockwood Lake before converging with the Mohawk River in the Hamlet of Palatine Church.

Fishing

Suckers can be speared and taken from the section of the creek within Montgomery County from January 1 to May 15, each year. Suckers can also be snagged in the portion within Fulton County between January 1 and May 15, each year.

References 

Rivers of Fulton County, New York
Mohawk River
Rivers of New York (state)
Rivers of Montgomery County, New York